Evandro Gonçalves de Oliveira Junior (born 17 July 1990) is a Brazilian beach volleyball player.

He competed at the 2016 Summer Olympics in Rio de Janeiro, in the men's beach volleyball tournament along with Pedro Solberg, falling in the quarterfinals. In 2017 he became world champion along with André Stein after winning the 2017 Beach Volleyball World Championships in Vienna, Austria.

He represented Brazil at the 2020 Summer Olympics with Bruno Oscar Schmidt.

References

External links
 
 Evandro at Confederação Brasileira de Voleibol 

1990 births
Living people
Brazilian men's beach volleyball players
Volleyball players from Rio de Janeiro (city)
Olympic beach volleyball players of Brazil
Beach volleyball players at the 2016 Summer Olympics
Beach volleyball players at the 2020 Summer Olympics
21st-century Brazilian people